One Exciting Week is a 1946 American comedy film directed by William Beaudine and written by Jack Townley and John K. Butler. The film stars Al Pearce, Pinky Lee, Jerome Cowan, Shemp Howard, Arlene Harris and Mary Treen. It was released on June 8, 1946 by Republic Pictures.

Plot

Cast   
Al Pearce as Dan Flannery
Pinky Lee as Itchy
Jerome Cowan as Al Carter
Shemp Howard as Marvin Lewis
Arlene Harris as Lottie Pickett
Mary Treen as Mabel Taylor
Lorraine Krueger as Helen Pickett
Maury Dexter as Jimmy Curtis
Will Wright as Otis Piper
Arthur Loft as Charlie Pickett
Chester Clute as Mayor Clarence Teeple
The Teen-Agers as Musical Ensemble

References

External links 
 

1946 films
1940s English-language films
American comedy films
1946 comedy films
Republic Pictures films
Films directed by William Beaudine
American black-and-white films
1940s American films